The IIFS (Individual Integrated Fighting System) was introduced in 1988, to serve as a fighting (arms, ammunition etc) and existence (food, first aid, etc) carrying system - a possible replacement for the All-purpose Lightweight Individual Carrying Equipment employed and fielded by United States Armed Forces since 1973. 

The IIFS replaces the partially obsolete concept of a shoulder harness, in the style of suspenders, and individual equipment belt design, with the newer concept of a tactical load bearing system that employs a vest. The vest as being the main component, is known as the TLBV (Tactical Load Bearing Vest), sometimes referred to as the LBV-88, the M-1988 LBV and later known as the ETLBV (Enhanced Tactical Load Bearing Vest).

History
The IIFS has conceptual roots in combat and load carrying vests designed by Natick Laboratories for the employment and use by United States Navy SEALs during the Vietnam War. The concept of a load carrying vest is that the weight of the equipment carried by the infantry rifleman is more evenly distributed over the body than with the employment of a load carrying concept of older design.

The IIFS load carrying vest, as having been a major conceptual improvement over precursing load bearing systems, was designed to replace the individual equipment belt, individual equipment belt suspenders, and small arms ammunition cases. These components have been an integral part of the ALICE system. The small arms ammunition cases continue to be utilized with the IIFS concept, to enable the carriage of additional small arms munitions.

Trial variants of the IIFS have utilized both the ALICE water canteen cover and ALICE field first aid dressing case in the Woodland camouflage pattern. The entrenching tool cover had remained unchanged and was also utilized during testing.

In the original design, as well as during troops trials, the tactical load carrying vest incorporated panels made of Kevlar, to improve the protection of the infantry rifleman, when worn in conjunction with the PASGT flak vest. The weight of this prototypic vest was considered to be too excessive to continue to consider this concept.

Along with the tactical load carrying vest, a new individual equipment belt was later introduced, featuring a black plastic ITW Fastex quick-release buckle and redesigned adjustment system. The original concept included the use of the earlier renewed individual equipment belt, which featured a grey side-release buckle, commonly referred to, due to its early prestige manufacturer, as the Bianchi pistol belt. It was decided that instead of contracting new individual ALICE components in the Woodland camouflage pattern, that the remainder of already existing and widely available ALICE components will be utilized with the IIFS These being mainly the water canteen cover, the field first aid dressing case, entrenching tool cover and small arms ammunition cases.

Like the ALICE system, and along the same design concepts, the IIFS is broken down into a fighting load and existence load.

In 1995, due to issues concerning chest and back ventilation caused by the non-breathable fabrics incorporated, the tactical load carrying vest was redesigned, and officially redesignated the ETLBV. No changes to the National Stock Number have been made. The two major modifications have been the slant of the magazine pouches inward, for easier removal of small arms magazines, and the exchange of the fabric panels, which retained body heat, both situated on the front and back, with lighter mesh panels.

The IIFS continues to serve the United States Armed Forces to date, though is being rapidly replaced by the MOLLE.

Fighting Load Components
The IIFS fighting load consists of the following standard issue components:

Belt, Individual Equipment. [NSN 8465-01-322-1965]
Vest, Ammunition Carrying. [NSN 8415-01-317-1622]
Vest, Tactical Load Bearing. [NSN 8415-01-296-8878]

In addition, the following ALICE system components are utilized with the IIFS

Carrier, Entrenching Tool. [NSN 8465-00-001-6474]
Case, Field First Aid Dressing. [NSN 8465-00-935-6814]
Cover, Water Canteen. [NSN 8465-00-860-0256]

The ALICE system small arms munitions pouch (Case, Small Arms Ammunition [NSN 8465-00-001-6482]) is also frequently used in conjunction with the IIFS to enable the carriage of additional small arms munitions. This is especially true with grenadiers (M203 grenade launcher operators) utilizing the 40mm ammunition carrying vest, which has no provisions for carrying 5.56mm magazines.

During Operation Just Cause in the year 1989, and later Operation Desert Storm in the year 1991, the M-1967 Modernized Load-Carrying Equipment (MLCE) field pack (Field Pack [NSN 8465-00-935-6825]) is resurrected for use with the IIFS system. A modified olive green version of the pack, sometimes referred to by soldiers as a butt pack, has been utilized for a three-day training pack, in conjunction with the ALICE system, yet was not a designated component of it. The IIFS variant is manufactured in the Woodland camouflage pattern and retains the same National Stock Number. The training pack also retains the same National Stock Number.

As primary component of the IIFS the tactical load carrying vest (Vest, Tactical Load Carrying [NSN 8415-01-317-1622]) is constructed of a seven-ounce nylon fabric printed in the Woodland camouflage pattern and weighs 1.8 pounds empty. The tactical load carrying vest is compatible with the standard individual equipment belt. The individual equipment belt is secured to the tactical load-carrying vest with 10 belt loops that use both hook and pile fasteners and snaps. The tactical load carrying vest has four permanently attached ammunition pockets that can carry six 30-round cartridge magazines for the M16 assault rifle. The pocket covers are secured by one snap and a strip of hook and pile. A pull tab is used to open the pocket. Located directly below the ammunition pockets are two pockets, designed to hold the M67 fragmentation grenade, they will also hold handcuffs should a member of the US Army Military Police Corps or USAF Security Forces be wearing the vest.  The shoulders are protected by 1/2 inch [1.27 cm] foam padding. The tactical load carrying vest closes in front with two chest straps using plastic quick release buckles. Two 2 inch [5.71 cm] webbing and two D-Rings sewn to the back of the tactical load carrying vest can be used as equipment attachment points.

As secondary component of the IIFS the ammunition carrying vest (Vest, Ammunition Carrying [NSN 8415-01-317-1622]) is intended for use by the infantry rifleman (grenadier), armed with either the M203 or M79 grenade launcher. It is constructed of a seven-ounce nylon fabric printed in the woodland camouflage pattern and weighs 2.1 pounds empty. The ammunition carrying vest is compatible with the standard individual equipment belt which is secured to the ammunition carrying vest with 10 belt loops. The loops use hook and pile fasteners and snaps. The ammunition carrying vest has 18 permanently attached ammunition pockets that can carry 4 pyrotechnic and 14 high explosive 40mm rounds. The pocket covers are secured by one snap. A pull tab is used to open the pocket. The shoulders are protected by 1/2 inch [1.27 cm] foam padding. The ammunition carrying vest closes in front with two chest straps using plastic quick release buckles. Two 2 inch [5.71 cm] webbing and two D-Rings sewn to the back of the ammunition carrying vest can be used as equipment attachment points.

Existence Load Components
The IIFS existence load comprises the following components:

Field Pack [NSN 8465-01-286-5356]
Pack, Patrol, Combat [NSN 8465-01-287-8128]

Field Pack - The field pack, also known as Field Pack, Large With Internal Frame [FPLIF] or Combat Field Pack M-1990 [CFP-90], is constructed of an 8.0 ounce backcoated nylon fabric printed in the woodland camouflage pattern which has excellent abrasion resistance and water repellency. The weight of the empty field pack is 8 pounds. The field pack has two major sections; the sleeping bag compartment, and the main compartment. The main compartment has a false bottom that may be opened for full use of the field pack when a sleeping bag is not carried. The outside of the field pack has one long tunneled pocket and two smaller cargo pockets, all using compression straps for securing contents. Equipment attachment points in the form of 2 inch [5.71 cm] webbing and 1 inch [2.54 cm] webbing loops are located throughout the field pack.

Early versions of the pack were produced by Lowe and are considered superior to the production "CFP-90"; the principal reason for this is the use of cotton thread on the production model.  The Lowe version is distinguished by having a brown canvas sleeping bag compartment, no top closing flap (the "Pack, Patrol, Combat" is used instead), a black snow collar, a unique suspension system, and black nylon thread.

The internal frame comprises two aluminum staves running the full height of the field pack. The staves are removable. The suspension system is adjustable allowing the user to position the field pack where it is most comfortable. The field pack has lower back padding as well as an extended lumbar support pad and the shoulder pads are made of bi-laminate foam. A softer, open cell foam is against the body for comfort followed by a stiffer closed cell foam for stability and good recovery after compression.

Two strap assemblies with quick release buckles allow for the attachment of the combat patrol pack atop the field pack when both packs are used together. When used in combination with either the ammunition carrying or tactical load-carrying vests, the field pack shoulder pads are worn over those of the vest, where they are retained by two one inch [2.54 cm] pieces of webbing.

Pack, Patrol, Combat - The combat patrol pack is designed for short missions and offers 1200 cubic inches of cargo space in two compartments. The main compartment is padded to protect the back from heavy, sharp items. The main compartment incorporates two tiedown straps that can be used to stabilize equipment such as a field radio. The combat patrol pack has a separate shoulder harness. When used in combination with either the ammunition carrying or tactical load-carrying vests, the combat patrol pack shoulder pads are worn over the vest shoulder pads, and retained for stability by two one inch [2.54 cm] pieces of webbing. The combat patrol pack can also be used in conjunction with the field pack.  With the "LCS-88" experimental version, the patrol pack attached directly to the shoulder straps of the LBV, and a waist belt was used to keep it from bouncing around.

See also
 M-1967 Modernized Load-Carrying Equipment or MLCE
 All-Purpose Lightweight Individual Carrying Equipment or ALICE
 Modular Lightweight Load-Carrying Equipment or MOLLE
 Buzo Tactico Assault Vest used by the Argentine Buzos Tácticos

References
Compatibility of Army Systems with Anthropometric Characteristics of Female Soldiers

Military equipment of the United States
Personal military carrying equipment
Military equipment introduced in the 1980s